Prince Augustus Frederick, Duke of Sussex (27 January 1773 – 21 April 1843), was the sixth son and ninth child of King George III and his queen consort, Charlotte of Mecklenburg-Strelitz. He was the only surviving son of George III who did not pursue an army or navy career. He was known for his liberal views, which included reform of Parliament, abolition of the slave trade, Catholic Emancipation, and the removal of existing civil restrictions on Jews and Dissenters.

Biography

Early life 
Augustus Frederick was born on 27 January 1773 at Buckingham House, London. He was the ninth child and sixth son of King George III and Queen Charlotte. 

Augustus Frederick was baptised in the Great Council Chamber at St James's Palace, on 25 February 1773, by Archbishop of Canterbury Frederick Cornwallis. His godparents were the Duke of Saxe-Gotha-Altenburg (his paternal first cousin once-removed, for whom The Earl of Hertford, Lord Chamberlain, stood proxy), Duke George Augustus of Mecklenburg (his maternal uncle, for whom the Earl of Bristol, Groom of the Stool, stood proxy) and Princess Charles of Hesse-Cassel (his first cousin once-removed, for whom The Viscountess Weymouth, Lady of the Bedchamber to the queen, stood proxy).

Augustus Frederick was tutored at home before being sent to the University of Göttingen in Germany in the summer of 1786, along with his brothers Prince Ernest and Prince Adolphus. Prince Augustus, who suffered from asthma, did not join his brothers in receiving military training in Hanover. He briefly considered becoming a cleric in the Church of England. In 1805, during the Napoleonic War, he served at home in Britain as Lieutenant-Colonel Commandant of the "Loyal North Britons" Volunteers regiment.

First marriage
 
While travelling in Italy, the prince met Lady Augusta Murray (1768–1830), the second daughter of the 4th Earl of Dunmore. The couple secretly married in Rome on 4 April 1793. The King's minister of Hanover affairs Ernst zu Münster was sent to Italy to escort him back to London.

The couple married again without revealing their full identities at St George's, Hanover Square, Westminster, on 5 December 1793. Both marriages took place without the consent, or even the knowledge, of his father.

In August 1794, the Court of Arches annulled the prince's first marriage on the grounds that it contravened the Royal Marriages Act 1772, not having been approved by the King. However, Prince Augustus Frederick continued to live with Lady Augusta until 1801, when he received a parliamentary grant of £12,000 and the couple separated, the Duke moving to Grosvenor Square. Lady Augusta retained custody of their children and received maintenance of £4,000 a year. Their two children were named Augustus Frederick d'Este and Augusta Emma d'Este, both parents being descended from the royal House of Este. In 1806, their mother, Lady Augusta, was given royal licence to use the surname "de Ameland" instead of Murray.

Duke of Sussex and Knight of the Garter 
Augustus Frederick was invested as a Knight of the Garter on 2 June 1786, and installed by dispensation on 28 May 1801. The King created him Duke of Sussex, Earl of Inverness, and Baron Arklow in the Peerage of the United Kingdom on 24 November 1801. Since he had no legitimate issue, the title became extinct on his death in 1843. In 1815 the Duke became a patron of the Jews' Hospital and Orphan Asylum, later to become the charity known today as Norwood. Royal patronage continued, with Queen Elizabeth II eventually becoming Norwood's patron.

Mistresses
A known mistress was Mrs. Bugge. Sir William Dillon recorded in his diary they were both present with him at a party held by Emma Hamilton (Lord Nelson's mistress) where she rented tableware for the meal but neglected to rent a carving knife, creating great difficulty in serving the Christmas dinner to her guests.

United Grand Lodge of England

In January 1813, Augustus Frederick became Grand Master of the Premier Grand Lodge of England, and in December of that year his brother, Prince Edward Augustus, Duke of Kent and Strathearn, became Grand Master of the Antient Grand Lodge of England. On 27 December 1813 the United Grand Lodge of England was constituted at Freemasons' Hall, London with Prince Augustus Frederick as Grand Master. In 1842, he founded the Royal Masonic Benevolent Institution.

George Oliver's Signs and Symbols Illustrated and Explained in a Course of Twelve Lectures on Freemasonry (1837) was dedicated to Prince Augustus Frederick, Duke of Sussex.

Second marriage 

A year after the death of Lady Augusta D'Ameland (Lady Augusta Murray), the Duke of Sussex married a second time on 2 May 1831 (again in contravention of the Royal Marriages Act) to Lady Cecilia Letitia Buggin (1793–1873), the eldest daughter of Arthur Gore, 2nd Earl of Arran, and Elizabeth Underwood, and the widow of Sir George Buggin. On the same day, Lady Cecilia assumed the surname Underwood by Royal Licence. She was never titled or recognized as the Duchess of Sussex. However, she was created Duchess of Inverness in her own right by Queen Victoria in 1840.

Later life 

William IV appointed his younger brother Chief Ranger and Keeper of St James's Park and Hyde Park on 29 January 1831, and Queen Victoria appointed her uncle Governor of Windsor Castle in 1842. The Duke of Sussex was elected president of the Society of Arts in 1816 and held that post for the rest of his life. He also held the honorary posts of Colonel of the Honourable Artillery Company from 1817, and of Captain-General (at which point the posts were united) from 1837 onward. He was president of the Royal Society between 1830 and 1838, and had a keen interest in biblical studies and Hebrew. His personal library contained over 50,000 theological manuscripts, some in Hebrew. In 1838, he introduced in a meeting scientist John Herschel, and the Duke gave a speech in which he spoke about the compatibility of science and religion:

The Duke of Sussex was the favourite uncle of Queen Victoria. He gave her away at her wedding to Prince Albert of Saxe-Coburg-Gotha in 1840. The Duke of Sussex died, aged 70 of erysipelas, at Kensington Palace in 1843. In his will he specified that he was not to have a state funeral and was accordingly buried at Kensal Green Cemetery on 4 May 1843. He is buried in front of the main chapel, immediately opposite the tomb of his sister, Princess Sophia.

The Duchess of Inverness continued to reside at Kensington Palace until her death in 1873. She was buried next to Prince Augustus.

Titles, styles, honours and arms

Titles and styles 
 27 January 1773 – 27 November 1801: His Royal Highness Prince Augustus Frederick
 24 November 1801 – 21 April 1843: His Royal Highness The Duke of Sussex
The duke held the subsidiary titles of Earl of Inverness and Baron Arklow.

Honours 
 Grand Prior of England of the Order of the Temple
 Grand Master of the Premier Grand Lodge of England, 1813
 Grand Master of the United Grand Lodge of England, 1813–1843
 Knight of the Order of the Garter, 27 June 1786
 Knight Grand Cross of the Royal Guelphic Order, 12 July 1815
 Knight of the Order of the Thistle, 19 July 1830
 Knight Grand Cross of the Order of the Bath, 15 December 1837
 Grand Master of the Order of the Bath, 16 December 1837
 Captain-General and Colonel Honourable Artillery Company

Arms 
As a son of the sovereign, the Duke of Sussex had use of the arms of the kingdom, differenced by a label argent of three points, the centre point bearing two hearts gules, the outer points each bearing a cross gules.

Issue

Ancestors

See also
 List of presidents of the Royal Society

Notes

External links 

 Sussex Correspondence. James Marshall and Marie-Louise Osborn Collection, Beinecke Rare Book and Manuscript Library, Yale University.

1773 births
1843 deaths
Augustus Frederick, Prince
 
Augustus Frederick, Prince
Augustus Frederick, Prince
 Augustus Frederick
Augustus Frederick, Duke of Sussex, Prince
Augustus Frederick, Duke of Sussex, Prince
Augustus Frederick, Duke of Sussex, Prince
Augustus Frederick
Great Masters of the Order of the Bath
Sussex, Augustus Frederick, Duke of
Sussex, Augustus Frederick, Duke of
Sussex, Augustus Frederick, Duke of
Augustus Frederick, Duke of Sussex, Prince
Freemasons of the Premier Grand Lodge of England
People from Westminster
Burials at Kensal Green Cemetery
Christian Hebraists
Grand Masters of the Premier Grand Lodge of England
British princes
Children of George III of the United Kingdom
Sons of kings